Stephen Hovey Botting (5 November 1845 – 23 January 1927) was an English cricketer. Botting was a right-handed batsman who bowled right-arm medium pace. He was born at Higham in Kent in 1845.

Botting played club cricket regularly at Cobham. He made his first-class cricket debut for Kent County Cricket Club against Sussex in 1867 at Ashford Road, Eastbourne in a match arranged by players rather than an official of either club. He made a second first-class appearance for Kent against the same opposition at the County Ground, Hove, in 1875.

Botting worked as a labourer and gardener throughout his life and played cricket as a professional. He married Jane Stevens in 1870, with the couple having 13 children. He died at Shorne near Gravesend, Kent on 23 January 1927 aged 81.

References

External links

1845 births
1927 deaths
Sportspeople from Gravesend, Kent
English cricketers
Kent cricketers
People from Higham, Kent
People from Shorne